WRC 3: FIA World Rally Championship (also known as WRC 3, WRC 3: FIA World Rally Championship 3 and 2012 FIA World Rally Championship) is the official racing video game of the 2012 World Rally Championship season. It was developed by Milestone srl.

Reception 

The game received "mixed or average" reviews according to the review aggregation website Metacritic. The consensus was that it was "far from perfect in achieving true simulation, but still fun and with loads of content". The PlayStation 3 version got to number 14 in the UK sales charts. In Japan, where the game was ported and published by CyberFront on 31 January 2013, Famitsu gave it a score of one eight and three sevens for the PS3 version, and all four sevens for the Vita version.

References

External links 

2012 video games
Milestone srl games
PlayStation 3 games
PlayStation Vita games
World Rally Championship video games
Windows games
Xbox 360 games
Video games developed in Italy
Video games set in Europe
Video games set in Portugal
Multiplayer and single-player video games
Bandai Namco games
Black Bean Games games
CyberFront games